Gogotsi (Ukrainian: Гогоці, Russian: Гогоци) is a gender-neutral Slavic surname that may refer to the following notable people:
George Gogotsi (born 1930), Ukrainian materials scientist
Yury Gogotsi (born 1961), Ukrainian materials scientist, son of George 

Ukrainian-language surnames